Kjeragbolten  (English: Kjerag Bolt) is a boulder on the mountain Kjerag in Sandnes municipality in Rogaland county, Norway. The rock itself is a  glacial deposit wedged in a large crevice in the mountain. It is a popular tourist destination and is accessible without any climbing equipment. It is also a popular site for BASE jumping. The boulder is just southwest of the village of Lysebotn, just south of the Lysefjorden.

Geology
Rogaland lies in a weak tectonic zone, allowing the river to dig into the surrounding sandstone mountain. During the several glaciations known to have occurred in Scandinavia, Norway was completely covered in glaciers. Between the glaciations, the meltwater formed and reformed the valley up to 22 times.  After the last glacial period, global warming caused a rise in sea level, flooding the fjords. The boulder was deposited during this last glaciation at around 50,000 B.C. As the Norwegian Glacier melted, it was accompanied by a rebound in rock formations as the ice was removed. In Kjeragbolten's case, the rebound was faster than the rising sea level, which wedged the rock into its current position.

Tourism
Kjeragbolten has long been a famed photo opportunity in the Kjerag trails. It was featured in the 2006 viral video Where the Hell is Matt? where traveler Matt Harding danced atop the precarious boulder. Because of its enormous popularity, long lines usually form with people who want to have a photo from the site. Expected waiting time can be anywhere from a few minutes to over an hour, especially when there are cruise ships in Stavanger.

In popular culture 
A movie song called Amali thumali (from 01:33m to 1:35m and from 04:19m to 04:21m) from the 2011 blockbuster Tamil language movie Ko (film) features the lead couples dancing on the top of the boulder at Kjeragbolten.
Kjeragbolten is depicted on the cover of the album A View from the Top of the World by American progressive metal band Dream Theater.

See also

 Preikestolen
Kjerag

References

External links

 Flickr Kjerabolten Images
 World BASE fatalities

Landforms of Rogaland
Cliffs of Norway
Forsand
Glacial deposits of Norway
Rock formations of Norway